Korni is a rural locality (a selo) in Novinsky Selsoviet of Volodarsky District, Astrakhan Oblast, Russia. The population was 6 as of 2010. There is 1 street.

Geography 
Korni is located on the Kornevaya River, 25 km southeast of Volodarsky (the district's administrative centre) by road. Krutoye is the nearest rural locality.

References 

Rural localities in Volodarsky District, Astrakhan Oblast